Eliane Le Breton (1897–1977) was a French physiologist known for her studies of cellular nutrition and the development of cancer cells. She was the director of research at the University of Strasbourg and taught at its Faculty of Medicine, and also worked at the Faculté des Sciences in Paris and Rennes.

Publications
 Variations biochimiques du rapport nucléo-plasmatique au cours du développement embryonnaire, 1923
 Signification physiologique de l'oxydation de l'alcool éthylique dans l'organisme, 1936

References

1897 births
1977 deaths
French physiologists
French women scientists
Women physiologists
20th-century French women